Shantal Munro-Knight is a Barbadian politician. She is also a senator in the Senate of Barbados. She serves as a Minister in the Prime Minister's Office of Barbados.

References 

Living people
Barbadian politicians
Government ministers of Barbados
Barbados Labour Party politicians
Members of the Senate of Barbados
Year of birth missing (living people)